The Toyota Corolla (E160) is the eleventh generation of the Toyota Corolla that is sold in Japan, Hong Kong, Macau, Bangladesh, Singapore and Sri Lanka. For international markets, the larger and substantially different Corolla (E170/E180) is offered instead. The E160 derives from the Toyota B platform, unlike the E170/E180 based on the New MC platform.

As with the preceding E140 models, the sedan version of the E160 is named Corolla Axio in the Japanese market; wagons carry the Corolla Fielder designation.

The eleventh generation of the Corolla went on sale in Japan in May 2012. Both are made by a Toyota subsidiary, Central Motors, in Miyagi prefecture, Japan.

The Japanese market Corolla (Axio) is shorter in length and narrower in width, and engines are kept below 2.0-liters, so as to be in compliance with Japanese Government dimension regulations so that Japanese buyers have a reduced road tax.

Trim levels available for the Axio are Luxel (later replaced by WXB), G, and X. This is also true for the Corolla Fielder (wagon variant), although the Fielder also includes a 1.8S and a 1.8S AeroTourer WXB (later replaced by 1.8S WXB) trim.

Toyota released hybrid versions of the Corolla Axio sedan and Corolla Fielder station wagon for the Japanese market in August 2013. Both cars are equipped with a 1.5-liter hybrid system similar to the one used in the Toyota Prius c, with a fuel efficiency of  under the JC08 test cycle.

Engines

Markets

Hong Kong 
In Hong Kong, the Corolla was based on the Japanese market model, initially available with the 1.5-liter 1NZ-FE engine in Advantage and Luxury trim levels. The smaller 1.5 L engine and car size contributes to a lower vehicle license levy.

In April 2015, Toyota in Hong Kong released the facelift model with the 1.5-liter 2NR-FKE engine in Luxury and Super Luxury trim levels.

The Corolla sold in Hong Kong is made in Japan, although it does vary from the Japanese market model with minor revisions to the interior, such as the inclusion of the tachometer and automatic climate air conditioning control in the Super Luxury variant.

New Zealand 
The wagon is also sold in New Zealand, aimed primarily at business and fleet customers. Available solely in GX trim, it includes a tachometer, but otherwise is very similar to the Japanese model wagon. Manual transmission and CVT are both available. Toyota New Zealand released the facelift model in July 2015.

Singapore 
The E160 Corolla sourced from Japan is also available in Singapore as the Corolla Axio in both petrol (X and G trims) and hybrid variants via imported dealerships.

Bangladesh 

The E160 Corolla sedan and station wagon were available from 2013 in Bangladesh . It was available in X , G and Wxb trims with 1.5 L petrol and hybrid variants.

Facelift 
In April 2015, Toyota released the facelift versions of the Corolla Axio and Corolla Fielder in Japan. This version featured a raised front bumper, revised headlamps with LED projector lens and grille, revised front fenders, revised tail lamps and "Toyota Safety Sense" collision avoidance system.

On 10 October 2017, Toyota released a second facelift to the Corolla Axio and Corolla Fielder in Japan. This version featured a revised front bumper and grille, an intelligent clearance sonar (parking support brake) and standard "Toyota Safety Sense".

The E160 Corolla was mainly replaced by the larger E210 Corolla in September 2019. However, it is still produced as a fleet vehicle . On 27 August 2019, the EX trim was announced, replacing the X trim, specializing in demand for business users. The engine lineup includes 1.5-liter petrol and 1.5-liter hybrid versions, with "Toyota Safety Sense" and a smart entry and start system as standard equipment, and all four color variations.

Gallery 
Corolla Axio

Corolla Fielder

References

External links 
 
 Official Website – Corolla Axio (Japan)
 Official Website – Corolla Fielder (Japan)

160
Cars introduced in 2012
2020s cars
Vehicles with CVT transmission
Hybrid electric cars
Partial zero-emissions vehicles